Gaines Township may refer to the following places in the United States:

 Gaines Township, Genesee County, Michigan
 Gaines Township, Kent County, Michigan
 Gaines Township, Pennsylvania

Township name disambiguation pages